The Universiti Putra Malaysia Bintulu Campus ( or UPMKB) is a branch campus of Universiti Putra Malaysia located in Bintulu, Sarawak. The campus was reopened in November 2001 based on the third objective of UPM's 2001-2010 planning strategy, which is to upgrade UPM's ability as an internationally acclaimed Centre of Study, Agricultural and Biosource Services.

UPMKB is situated 10 kilometers from the town of Bintulu, and is surrounded by an environment rich in flora and fauna, and this natural abundance is fully utilized to affirm UPM's mission to further explore the fields in agriculture and biosource. The campus covers an area of 714 hectares and matriculated more than 1,500 students (in 2019).

History 
UPMKB is not a new name amongst the nation's institutions of higher learning. In fact, it is one of the oldest institutions of higher learning in Sarawak. The history of UPMKB can be traced back to 10 August 1974, when it was a temporary campus under the National Resources Training Centre in Semenggok, Kuching. In June 1987, the campus relocated to its permanent site in Bintulu. On 27 August 1987, Universiti Pertanian Malaysia Sarawak was officially established as a branch campus through the under 3 centres of learning – Applied Sciences, Basic Sciences and Social Sciences and Management. Three Diploma-level programs were on offer; the Diploma in Agriculture, Diploma in Forestry and Diploma in Agribusiness programs, as well as an initiation program.

Closure and reopening 
During the month of September, 1994, UPMKB was closed down and brought under the wing of the Malaysia Ministry of Education to be converted into a temporary site for a teachers' training college. However, under a directive by the Cabinet, UPMKB was reopened on November 5, 2001. The first batch of students for the November 2001/2002 semester numbered at 242 students who enrolled in the Diploma in Agriculture, Diploma in Forestry and Diploma in Engineering (Emergency and Safety) programs.

First batch of graduates after reopening 
Approximately 600 students from this faculty have successfully completed their diploma-level program during the 2004/2005 session, with an additional 85 students from the 2005/2006 session. The first batch of UPMKB graduates received their diploma during the Convocation held in the months of July and September, 2005.

Faculties 
The campus has two faculties namely Faculty of Agricultural Science and Forestry (FSPH) and Faculty of Humanities, Management and Science (FKPS). Both faculties are formed on 1 July 2020, as a result of restructuring in UPMKB. The restructuring began in 2018 where five main thrusts have been identified, which are agriculture, forestry, industrial chemistry, renewable energy and ethnic study. The five main thrusts help the campus positioning itself and determining its future education plan.

Sri Rajang College 
The Sri Rajang College (Kolej Sri Rajang or KSR) is the only residential college in the campus, providing accommodation facilities to the students. It was established in 2002, named after the longest river in Malaysia, the Rajang River. KSR consists of 10 blocks that could accommodate up to 1,770 students. The location of KSR is adjacent to cafeteria, clinic and self-service laundry.

Gallery

See also 
 List of universities in Malaysia

References

External links 

 Official portal of UPMKB

University of Putra Malaysia
Universities and colleges in Sarawak
Educational institutions established in 1974
1974 establishments in Malaysia